USS Agenor (ARL-3) was one of 39  landing craft repair ships built for the United States Navy during World War II. Named for Agenor (in history and Greek mythology, a king of Tyre), she was the only U.S. Naval vessel to bear the name.

Construction and career
She was laid down on 24 January 1943, MC hull 1010, by Kaiser Shipyards, Yard No. 4, Richmond, California; launched on 3 April 1943; and commissioned at San Francisco, on 20 August 1943.

Service in the United States Navy
From December 1943 through 9 June 1944, Agenor provided repair services to numerous landing craft operating in the Solomon, Russell, and Marshall Islands. On 9 June, the repair ship got underway for the Marianas. Eight days later, Japanese torpedo bombers attacked Agenors convoy. Despite several near misses, the ship continued on safely to waters off Saipan where she arrived on 24 June.

Agenor was then assigned duty with a salvage group, Task Group 52.7 (TG 52.7). While air raids were a constant threat, the vessel carried out her work successfully. On 15 July, she moved to Tinian to supply services to invasion forces there.

The ship sailed to Guam in early August, and reported to Task Force 53 (TF 53). That island was her base of operations through 2 October, when the ship shifted to Ulithi in the Carolines. Agenor returned to Guam on 10 February 1945, to prepare for the Iwo Jima landings.

On 20 February, the repair ship arrived off Iwo Jima and joined TG 51.3. During the operations there, Agenor carried out her work despite air attack and heavy seas. The ship remained at Iwo Jima until 25 June. She then got underway for Saipan, where she dropped anchor on 29 June.

Soon after reporting to Service Squadron 10 for duty, Agenor left Saipan bound for Hawaii and a much-needed overhaul. The vessel reached Pearl Harbor on 18 July and entered the navy yard. The Japanese surrender found the ship still undergoing repairs at Pearl Harbor. Upon completion of the yard work, Agenor served in the Hawaiian operating area until placed out of commission, in reserve, on 15 November 1946.

Service in the French Navy
Agenor was transferred to the government of France on 2 March 1951, under the terms of the Mutual Defense Assistance Act and renamed RFS Vulcain (A656). Her name was struck from the Naval Vessel Register on 26 March 1951.

In 1952, she was present in Indochina to support the First Indochina War by transporting troops and repairing launching crafts.

She took part in Operation Hirondelle in July 1953.

On 15 September 1957, she was transferred to the Republic of China with the help of the United States.

Service in the Republic of China Navy
Transferred by France to the Republic of China Navy in 1957 and renamed ROCS Shung Shan (ARL-336). The ship was handed over to Taiwan by the United States in Subic Bay, Philippines on 15 September 1957. Only by 20 September 1957, she arrived in Taiwan to be commissioned.

Before the ship was received, Taiwan had a self-modified repair ship. It was during the 1952 Retreat of the Government of the Republic of China to Taiwan on the offshore islands of Zhejiang. Due to the serious damage of the other repair ship, the ship returned to Keelung was too time-consuming and dangerous for repairs, so she had to choice but to be in combat. The landing ship ROCS Chung Chuan (LST-221) was converted into a repair ship and renamed ROCS Heng Shan (ARL-335), and was stationed at the battlefield. When the Song Shan was put into service in 1957, Heng Shan was changed again but back to the original name and number.

She was later renamed ROCS Tai Wu'' (AP-520) in 1968.

The ship was decommissioned in April 1983.

AwardsAgenor'' earned three battle stars for her World War II service.

Notes 

Citations

Bibliography 

Online resources

External links

Achelous-class repair ships
Achelous-class repair ships converted from LST-1-class ships
Ships built in Richmond, California
1943 ships
World War II auxiliary ships of the United States
S3-M2-K2 ships
Ships transferred from the United States Navy to the French Navy